Patricia Jessie Giles  (16 November 1928 – 9 August 2017) was a women's activist and Australian Senator. She was the President of the International Alliance of Women for three terms, the last ending in 2004.

Life
A qualified nurse, she founded the Women's Electoral Lobby branch in Perth in 1973. She also returned to study at the University of Western Australia, where she received her Bachelor of Arts in 1974. She later became an organizer for the Hospital Employees Union of Western Australia, and she was the first woman on the executive of the West Australian Trades and Labor Council. In 1981 she was elected as an Australian Labor Party Senator for Western Australia. During her twelve years as a senator she was active in issues related to women, she led the Australian delegation to the United Nations Decade for Women meetings in the 1980s. She and Sara Dowse contributed the piece "Women in a Warrior Society" to the 1984 anthology Sisterhood Is Global: The International Women's Movement Anthology, edited by Robin Morgan.

Following her retirement from politics, she continued to be active in women's rights, serving three terms as president of the International Alliance of Women.  On Australia Day, 2010, she was named a Member of the Order of Australia, "For service to the community through organisations and advisory bodies that promote the interests of women, and to the Parliament of Australia". She died on 9 August 2017.

References

External links
 
 

1928 births
2017 deaths
International Alliance of Women people
Australian Labor Party members of the Parliament of Australia
Australian feminists
Members of the Australian Senate
Members of the Australian Senate for Western Australia
Members of the Order of Australia
Women members of the Australian Senate
University of Western Australia alumni
20th-century Australian politicians
20th-century Australian women politicians